Songs Music Publishing, also known as SONGS, is a music publishing company founded by Matt Pincus and joined by partners Ron Perry in 2004 and Carianne Marshall in 2006.  The company has offices in New York City, Los Angeles and London.

SONGS represents songwriters and producers across all genres of music. SONGS' growth has been achieved through the signing of worldwide, exclusive co-publishing agreements with individual writers and through catalog acquisitions.

As of November 2013, founder Matt Pincus continues to serve as CEO of SONGS, Ron Perry serves as the company's President, and Carianne Marshall serves as the Head of Creative Licensing.

In June 2017, SONGS Music Publishing signed worldwide co-publishing deals with four songwriters in contemporary music: Xxxtentacion, Linus Eklow, S1, and Andrew Wyatt.

In September 2017, Songs Music Publishing was put up for sale for over $160 million. In December 2017, SONGS was acquired by Kobalt Music Group.

Clients

Among SONGS' current and past songwriter and producer clients are:

SONGS 
 
''''

External links
Songs Music Publishing Web Site

Mass media companies established in 2004
American companies established in 2004
Music publishing companies of the United States
2017 mergers and acquisitions